François Lamiraud (born 5 April 1983) is a French road cyclist.

He is known for beating the hour record of France held by Roger Rivière since 1958 on 11 April 2015.

References

External links

1983 births
Living people
French male cyclists
Cyclists from Marseille